Gulf Harbour is a development some 4 km from the end of the Whangaparaoa Peninsula, towards the northern end of Auckland, New Zealand. It has one of the country's largest marinas, one of the country's top golf courses, and is regarded as a retreat for Auckland's well-off. The site is also known as Hobbs Bay, and was sold in the early seventies by  landowners, the Hobbs family, who still retain some of the coastal area including the Hobbs Bay beach.

A ferry service operates between Gulf Harbour and downtown Auckland.

Demographics

Gulf Harbour had a population of 5,598 at the 2018 New Zealand census, an increase of 1,296 people (30.1%) since the 2013 census, and an increase of 2,304 people (69.9%) since the 2006 census. There were 2,028 households, comprising 2,814 males and 2,784 females, giving a sex ratio of 1.01 males per female, with 1,191 people (21.3%) aged under 15 years, 798 (14.3%) aged 15 to 29, 2,709 (48.4%) aged 30 to 64, and 903 (16.1%) aged 65 or older.

Ethnicities were 83.0% European/Pākehā, 5.5% Māori, 2.1% Pacific peoples, 14.4% Asian, and 3.2% other ethnicities. People may identify with more than one ethnicity.

The percentage of people born overseas was 46.7, compared with 27.1% nationally.

Although some people chose not to answer the census's question about religious affiliation, 49.5% had no religion, 38.6% were Christian, 0.2% had Māori religious beliefs, 1.9% were Hindu, 0.6% were Muslim, 1.3% were Buddhist and 1.3% had other religions.

Of those at least 15 years old, 1,131 (25.7%) people had a bachelor's or higher degree, and 519 (11.8%) people had no formal qualifications. 1,140 people (25.9%) earned over $70,000 compared to 17.2% nationally. The employment status of those at least 15 was that 2,238 (50.8%) people were employed full-time, 600 (13.6%) were part-time, and 129 (2.9%) were unemployed.

Education
Gulf Harbour School is a decile 10 primary school (years 1–6) school with a roll of  students.

Wentworth College is a secondary (years 7-13) school with a roll of  students. It is a private school which opened in 2003. Wentworth Primary School is a private primary school which opened in February 2008 on the same site. It has a roll of  students.

All three schools are coeducational.

The closest public high school to Gulf Harbour is Whangaparaoa College.

References

External links
 Gulf Harbour School website
 Wentworth College website
 Wentworth Primary website

Populated places in the Auckland Region
Marinas in New Zealand
Hibiscus Coast